Juliet Chekwel (born 25 May 1990) is a Ugandan long-distance runner. She competed in the 10,000 metres at the 2015 World Championships in Beijing placing 17th in a new national record of 32:20.95. She competed in the 5000 m and 10,000 m events at the 2016 Summer Olympics.

In 2019, she competed in the senior women's race at the 2019 IAAF World Cross Country Championships held in Aarhus, Denmark. She finished in 13th place. In 2020, she competed in the women's half marathon at the 2020 World Athletics Half Marathon Championships held in Gdynia, Poland.

In June 2021, she qualified to represent Uganda at the 2020 Summer Olympics.

International competitions

References

External links
 

1990 births
Living people
Ugandan female long-distance runners
Ugandan female steeplechase runners
Olympic athletes of Uganda
World Athletics Championships athletes for Uganda
People from Kapchorwa District
Athletes (track and field) at the 2016 Summer Olympics
Athletes (track and field) at the 2020 Summer Olympics
Athletes (track and field) at the 2018 Commonwealth Games
Commonwealth Games competitors for Uganda
20th-century Ugandan women
21st-century Ugandan women